Frank B. Zinn (December 24, 1920 – May 2, 2009) is an American attorney, politician, and jurist who served as the 18th attorney general of New Mexico in 1959. From 1959 to 1975, he served as a judge of the New Mexico Eleventh Judicial District Court from 1959 to 1975.

Early life and education 
Zinn was born in Tucumcari, New Mexico, the son of A. L. Zinn, a justice of the New Mexico Supreme Court. He attended high school and junior college at the New Mexico Military Institute.

Career 
During World War II, Frank served in the United States Army. He later served in the New Mexico National Guard before retiring in 1981 as a lieutenant colonel. Zinn was elected attorney general of New Mexico in 1958 and assumed office in 1959. He resigned in the same year after being appointed as a judge of the New Mexico Eleventh Judicial District Court by then-Governor John Burroughs. Zinn served as a judge until 1975 and later worked as a special master and arbitration judge on federal courts.

Personal life 
Zinn was married to Anne Shaffer Zinn from 1950 until her death in 1999. After his wife's death, Zinn relocated to Michigan to be closer to his son, daughter-in-law, and grandchildren.

References 

1920 births
2009 deaths
New Mexico lawyers
People from Tucumcari, New Mexico
People from Quay County, New Mexico
Military personnel from New Mexico
New Mexico Attorneys General
New Mexico Military Institute alumni